"I Still Believe in Christmas" is a song by American contemporary Christian music singer Anne Wilson, released on October 29, 2021. Wilson co-wrote the song with Jeff Pardo and Matthew West.

"I Still Believe in Christmas" peaked at number fifteen on the US Hot Christian Songs chart.

Background
On October 29, 2021, Anne Wilson released the multi-track single "I Still Believe in Christmas" accompanied with a lyric video of the song. She shared the story behind "I Still Believe in Christmas", calling it "a song of the hope we have in Our precious Lord and Savior, Jesus. It can be hard to cling to hope in the middle of the world we are in right now, but we have to choose to still believe in the miracle of Christmas. I pray this song leads you closer to Jesus and fills you with His love and comfort during this holiday season."

Composition

Commercial performance
"I Still Believe in Christmas" made its debut at number 40 on the US Christian Airplay chart dated December 4, 2021. The song reached number one on the Christian Airplay chart dated January 1, 2022, becoming Wilson's second number one on the chart, after "My Jesus".

Track listing
All tracks were produced by Jonathan Smith and Jeff Pardo.

Personnel
Adapted from AllMusic.

 Jacob Arnold — drums, percussion
 Joe Baldridge — engineer
 Chris Bevins — editing
 Court Clement — acoustic guitar, banjo, Dobro, mandolin, Pedal Steel
 Courtlan Clement — electric guitar
 Nickie Conley — background vocals
 Jason Eskridge — background vocals
 Andy Leftwich — fiddle, mandolin
 Tony Lucido — bass
 Pete Lyman — mastering engineer
 Jamie MacDonald — background vocals
 Matt Menefee — banjo
 Scott Mulvahill — double bass
 Scotty Murray — lap steel guitar
 Jeff Pardo — background vocals, mixing, piano, producer, programmer, synthesizer programming, Wurlitzer
 Kiely Phillips — background vocals
 Louis Remenappat — assistant engineer
 Jonathan Smith — acoustic guitar, background vocals, Mellotron, producer, programmer
 Doug Weier — mixing
 Anne Wilson — primary artist, background vocals, vocals

Charts

Release history

References

External links
 

2021 singles
2021 songs
Anne Wilson songs
Songs written by Anne Wilson
Songs written by Jeff Pardo
Songs written by Matthew West
Sparrow Records singles